Don Álvaro de Bazán, called the Elder (1506–1558) was a Spanish naval commander from an old Navarrese noble family who received several nobilary titles such as the rank of Admiral of Castile, Marquis del Viso, and General-Captain of the Galleys of Spain. He was the father of Álvaro de Bazán, 1st Marquis of Santa Cruz, who surpassed him in fame. At the age of eight his son was appointed "Military Governor and captain of the fortress and city of Gibraltar". His command however was via his father. It has been speculated that this unusual appointment was intended to show Charles V's confidence but Bazán the Elder did not share that confidence and he suggested to no effect that Gibraltar's Line Wall Curtain be extended to the southern tip of the rock.

Bazán the Elder was also father of Alonso de Bazán, a military commander who died during the conquest the Peñón de Vélez de la Gomera, and Joan Bazán. In 1549 Bazán received from Charles V the villages of Viso del Marqués and Santa Cruz de Mudela.

Important feats during his military career
 1523–1524: Took part in the siege of Fuenterrabía.
 1526 After the death of Juan de Velasco, he assumed his rank as General-Captain of the Galleys of Spain
 1532 Captured the city of Orey with 10 galleys; using the treasure obtained from this capture, he increased the number of galleys for Spain.
 1533 Captured the Turkish corsair Jabanarrez, in Falkavivas.
 1535 Led the Spanish galleys in the campaign of Charles V against Tunis.
 1536 Captured the flagship of the Argelian navy, that among French ships, was about to pillage the Spanish coasts.
 1539 Charles V sold him the villages of Viso del Marqués y Santa Cruz de Mudela, where his son ordered the construction of a marvelous renacentist palace that he would convert in the residence of its descendants.
 1543: Received the supreme rank of Capitán-General del mar océano. (General captain of the Ocean Sea). Led the ships of Biscay, Guipúzcoa and the Cuatro Villas, and defeated the French navy under Admiral Burye in the Battle of Muros Bay.
 1550: Obtained the privilege of building galleons and galleys of his invention in order to protect the route to the Indies from corsair attacks.
 1554-1559: Defended the Spanish-American coasts against possible attacks, capturing several ships.

References

Bibliography
Hoffman E, Paul. Spanish Crown and the Defense of the Caribbean 1535-1585: Precedent, Patrimonialism, and Royal Parsimony Louisiana State University Press (June 1980) 
Trevor, Reginald. Davies The golden century of Spain, 1501-1621 Ams Pr Inc (1996) 
 John Francis Guilmartin, Francis John. Gunpowder and Galleys: Changing Technology and Mediterranean Warfare at Sea in the 16th Century  Naval Institute Press; Revised edition (2004) 
Perez-Mallaina E, Rahn Phillips Rahn, Carla. Spain's men of the sea: daily life on the Indies fleets in the sixteenth century The Johns Hopkins University Press (1998) 

Spanish admirals
1506 births
1558 deaths